P2 (P2 is a short form for "Professional Plug-In") is a professional digital recording solid-state memory storage media format introduced by Panasonic in 2004, and especially tailored to electronic news-gathering (ENG) applications. It features tapeless (non-linear) recording of DV, DVCPRO, DVCPRO25, DVCPRO50, DVCPRO-HD, or AVC-Intra streams on a solid-state flash memory.  The P2 card is essentially a RAID of Secure Digital (SD) memory cards with an LSI controller tightly packaged in a die-cast PC Card (formerly PCMCIA) enclosure, so data transfer rate increases as memory capacity increases. The system includes cameras, decks as drop-in replacements for videocassette recorders (VCR), and a special 5.25-inch computer drive for random-access integration with non-linear editing systems (NLE). The cards can also be used directly where a PC card (PCMCIA) slot is available, as in most older notebook computers, as a normal hard disk drive, although a custom software driver must first be loaded.

As of early 2010, P2 cards are available in capacities of 4, 8, 16, 32 and 64 GB. At introduction, P2 cards offered low recording capacity compared to competing, video tape-based formats (a miniDV tape holds roughly 13 GB of data, and an S-size HDCAM tape holds 50 GB). To solve this, camcorders and decks using P2 media employ multiple card slots, with the ability to span the recording over all slots. Cards are recorded in sequence, and when a card is full, it can be swapped out while another card is recording. This limits recording time only by power supply and the available number of cards. If a card is partially full, the deck will record only until it is full.  Unlike video tape, old video cannot be recorded over accidentally; old footage must be manually deleted.

P2 cards are of a ruggedized PCMCIA type with the fastest transfer speeds currently available through this format. The card also contains a processor that organizes and safeguards the files and the case is developed and crafted to "military" (according to Panasonic) specifications, making P2 cards tough and reliable.

The first pieces of equipment released by Panasonic which use the P2 format included the AJ-SPX800 (a 2/3" broadcast camcorder for ENG and EFP applications), the studio recorder AJ-SPD850, the AJ-PCD10 offload device (basically, a five-slot PC card reader with USB interface designed to fit a 5-1/4" IT systems bay), and the memory cards themselves – AJ-P2C004 (4 GB) and AJ-P2C002 (2 GB).  Panasonic is currently shipping a wide range of camcorders that support the P2 format, including the professional video camera AG-HVX200 HD handheld camcorder, and the high-end, or broadcast professional shoulder-mount AG-HPX500, AJ-HPX2000, and AJ-HPX3000 camcorders.  Panasonic has also announced the P2-based AG-HPX170 handheld HD tapeless camcorder.  The HPX170 is very similar to the HVX200 and the HVX200A, the main difference being the lack of a video tape drive on the 170. The latest products to feature P2 technology are the well-received recently launched AJ-HPX2700 and AH-HPX3700 "Varicam" high end cameras.

On April 15, 2012, Panasonic introduced the "MicroP2" system, an entirely different format based on SDHC/SDXC conforming to UHS-II (Ultra-High Speed) bus mode. Most (but not all) current P2 products can use MicroP2 (UHS-II) and SDHC/SDXC (UHS-I/UHS-II) cards through a MicroP2 card adapter, with some requiring a firmware update. Some P2 products (such as the AG-HPX500E camera) are not able to use MicroP2 at all.

On February 27, 2014, Panasonic has announced a new generation of P2 media, the expressP2 card, designed to accommodate high frame rate 1080 HDAVC-ULTRA recording (above 60fps) as well as 4K capture.

Specifications 
 File format: MXF
 Maximum datarate: 1.22 Gbit/s
 Available sizes: 2, 4, 8, 16, 32 and 64 GB
 Form factor: PC card (PCMCIA) type II

P2 card run times timetable 

Panasonic recently published a slightly more complicated version of this table for 16 and 32 GB cards.

P2 camera range

Handheld models 
AG-HPX170 (NTSC version)
 Compact, lightweight HD/SD camera-recorder
 13× zoom lens with 28 mm wide-angle

AG-HPX171 (European version)
 Compact, lightweight HD/SD camera-recorder
 13× zoom lens with 28 mm wide-angle
 Improved ergonomics, features and image quality compared to its predecessor

AG-HVX200
 Progressive native 16:9 HD 3CCD imaging system
 HD quality Leica Dicomar wide-angle zoom lens
 Progressive modes supported

AG-HPX250

AG-HVX202AEN HD DVC-PRO

Shoulder mount models
AG-HPX300/HPX301
 Three pieces of 1/3-inch MOS image sensor (1920 × 1080 pixels each)
 Removable 1/3-inch lens
 AVC-Intra 50/100 and DVCPRO HD/50/25 codecs compatible
 Variable Frame Rate
 LCoS viewfinder
 Two P2 slots

AG-HPX370/371
 New 2,2MPx MAICO CMOS sensor with improved sensitivity F11
 Other features as above HPX301

AG-HPX500/HPX555
 Three pieces of 2/3-inch CCD image sensor (960 × 540 pixels each)
 DVCPRO HD/50/25 codecs  compatible
 Variable Frame rate function
 Four P2 slots

AJ-HPX2000(AJ-HPX2100 in Europe)
 Three pieces of 2/3-inch CCD image sensor (1280 × 720 pixels each)
 DVCPRO HD codecs compatible
 AVC-Intra 50 and 100 codecs as an option
 10 bit/4:2:2 Recording with Full Sampling as an option
 Variable Frame rate function
 Five P2 slots

AJ-HPX2700
 One of the new P2 Varicam range
 Variable Frame Rate of 1 frame/s to 60 frame/s
 10 bit/4:2:2 Recording with Full Sampling
 AVC-Intra codec recording system

AJ-HPX3000
 DVCPRO HD/AVC-Intra codecs compatible
 Native 1080p 4:2:2 10-bit
 Newly developed high-resolution 2.2-megapixel CCD

AJ-HPX3700
 Super High-End HD Camera-Recorder for Cinema Production, part of the P2 Varicam range
 RGB 4:4:4 and 24PsF output
 AVC-Intra codec recording system

References

External links 
 

Video storage
Solid-state computer storage media